Herbert Raymond Mayes (1900-October 30, 1987) was an American journalist and magazine editor, best known for serving as editor of Good Housekeeping and McCall's, from which he retired in 1965.Saxon, Wolfgang. (1 November 1987). Herbert Mayes, 87, A Former Top Editor of Magazines, Dies, The New York Times, p. 52

Mayes became managing editor of Good Housekeeping in 1937, and editor the following year.  He took over McCall's in 1958 and made it the highest circulation of the "Seven Sisters".  He became president of the McCall Corporation in 1962.

References

1900 births
1987 deaths
People from New York City
American magazine editors